Christian Eugene Williams (born November 21, 2004), known professionally as yvngxchris (pronounced as "Yung Chris"), is an American rapper from Virginia. He is better known for his unreleased song "Blood On The Leaves" which received traction on TikTok. He is signed to Columbia and is managed by American rapper Pusha T.

Early life 
Williams was born in Portsmouth, Virginia. His father works as a project manager and his mother works as a nurse. When Williams was 6, his family moved to Jacksonville, Florida for a couple of months. But he later moved to Chesapeake, Virginia, where he was fully raised.

Career

2017: Beginnings
In 2017, Williams began to rap being influenced by his father playing hip-hop music around him. He was recording through iPhone earbuds.

2020-2022: Breakthrough
In October 2020, Williams first came to light with the popularity of his song Kyrie Irving! on TikTok. In January 2022, he appeared on late rapper PnB Rock's mixtape SoundCloud Daze. In March 2022, he released a song titled excuse me? which received traction on TikTok. In August 2022, he released an EP titled Virality which included appearances from Lil Yachty, DC the Don, and XLOVCLO.

Discography

Albums

Collaborative Extended Plays

Singles

Collaborative Singles

References

External links 
 

Songwriters from Virginia
Living people
American male rappers
2004 births
Rappers from Virginia